Nodocolaspis is a genus of leaf beetles in the subfamily Eumolpinae. They are known from Central America and South America. The genus was first established by the Czech entomologist Jan Bechyné in 1949, as a relative of Nodonota (now known as Brachypnoea) containing species formerly placed in Colaspis.

Species
The following species are included in Nodocolaspis:
 Nodocolaspis antennalis Bechyné, 1953
 Nodocolaspis colombica (Jacoby, 1900)
 Nodocolaspis costipennis (Lefèvre, 1877)
 Nodocolaspis costipennis cayennensis (Bechyné, 1955)
 Nodocolaspis costipennis costipennis (Lefèvre, 1877)
 Nodocolaspis femoralis (Lefèvre, 1878)
 Nodocolaspis impressa (Lefèvre, 1877)
 Nodocolaspis multicostata (Jacoby, 1900)
 Nodocolaspis paulistana Bechyné, 1953
 Nodocolaspis quadrifoveata (Bowditch, 1921)
 Nodocolaspis rugulosa Bechyné, 1953
 Nodocolaspis smaragdina Bechyné & Bechyné, 1964
 Nodocolaspis tarsata (Lefèvre, 1882)
 Nodocolaspis tarsata acallosa (Bechyné, 1949)
 Nodocolaspis tarsata tarsata (Lefèvre, 1882)
 Nodocolaspis tuberculata Bechyné, 1953

The type species, N. costipennis, was originally described as "Colaspis costipennis" by Lefèvre in 1877, which makes the name a junior homonym of Colaspis costipennis Crotch, 1873; however, Jan Bechyné considered it worthless to correct the homonymy after having established a new genus for the Lefèvre species. Separately, Doris Holmes Blake renamed the Lefèvre species to "Colaspis lophodes" in 1974.

The generic placement of the Central American species N. femoralis and N. impressa is uncertain; they were transferred to Nodocolaspis from Colaspis by Jan Bechyné in 1953 and 1958, but Flowers (1996) disagreed with the validity of the transfers and included them in Colaspis, where they have been traditionally placed.

References

Eumolpinae
Chrysomelidae genera
Beetles of Central America
Beetles of South America